Trifonia Melibea Obono (born 27 November 1982 in Afaetom, Evinayong, Equatorial Guinea) is a novelist, political scientist, academic and LGBTQI+ activist. Her novel La Bastarda is the first novel by a female Equatorial Guinean writer to be translated into English.

Academic career 
Obono has a degree in Political Science & Journalism awarded by the University of Murcia in Spain and later studied there for an MA in International Development. She is a professor in the Department of Social Sciences at the UNGE (National University of Equatorial Guinea) in Malabo, as well as teaching since 2013 in the Afro-Hispanic Studies Center of the UNED. She is currently studying for an PhD at the University of Salamanca looking at gender and equality. Obono has written on how women's lives in Spanish-speaking Africa have been visualised through postcolonial and African perspectives.

Literary career 

Obono has published four novels in Spanish: Las mujeres hablan mucho y mal (2019), La albina del dinero (2017), Yo no quería ser madre (2016), La Bastarda (2016). All works deal with the themes of women's rights, gender and sexuality. Obono has been described as one of the bravest writers due to her confrontation of these issues. Her work is also concerned with legacies of Spanish colonisation in Africa and she is an expert on the history of "Spanish Guinea". Her work makes an important contribution to black African, Spanish-speaking, Atlantic cultures.

La Bastarda is the first novel by a woman from Equatorial Guinea to be translated into English. Due to its lesbian protagonist, the book is currently banned in Equatorial Guinea. Translated by Lawrence Schimel, an extract is included in the 2019 anthology New Daughters of Africa (edited by Margaret Busby).

LGBTQ+ activism 

Obono is outspoken about LGBTQ+ human rights issues in Equatorial Guinea. She uses her literary work as activism, by writing LGBTIQ+ characters, she provides representation for others are not heterosexual. She has written about the taboos that mean that homosexuality is not discussed in her country and uses her global platforms to call these out as false. Obono herself is bisexual.

Awards 

 2019 - Global Literature in Libraries Initiative Award
 2019 - Ideal Woman Award (Equatorial Guinea)
 2018 - International Prize for African Literature

References 

Equatoguinean writers
Living people
Equatoguinean women writers
Bisexual writers
Equatoguinean LGBT people
Bisexual academics
1982 births